William Daddano Sr. (December 28, 1912 – September 9, 1975), also known as "William Russo" and "Willie Potatoes," was a top enforcer and loan shark for the Chicago Outfit and a participant in some high-profile robberies.

Early years
Born in Chicago, Illinois, Daddano became a member of the Forty-Two Gang, a local street gang from Maxwell Street on Chicago's West Side. Gang members included such future Outfit heavyweights as Sam Giancana ( also known as "Momo" or "Mooney") and Sam "Teets" Battaglia. He lived in North Riverside, Illinois with his wife Mary and five children. He never had a known legitimate means of employment or business known to the FBI.

Enforcer and mobster
By 1936, at age 24, Daddano had accumulated an extensive criminal record in the 42-Gang, including nine counts of bank robbery, larceny and auto theft. Giancana and Battaglia eventually recruited Daddano into the Chicago Outfit. In 1944, Daddano was arrested for attempting to steal three million war ration stamps. While police suspected that the Outfit was behind this crime, Daddano refused to name his accomplices. After World War II, Daddano became a leading enforcer for The Outfit. He also controlled illegal gambling operations in Dupage, Will and Kane counties and in the Chicago suburbs of Cicero and Berwyn.

Though a "made man" and valued "capo" in the Chicago Outfit, Daddano was not unlike Sam "Mad Sam" DeStefano, who was not allowed by the Outfit bosses to be "made." Daddano has been described as a "ruthless and pitiless killer" who was refined in torture with ice picks and blowtorches, keeping victims alive for hours while torturing them. In 1963, he had left a Capone-era mobster's wake with DeStefano, in his Cadillac, with Chicago police in hot pursuit of the speeding car. Daddano was the main suspect in at least seven murders.

Daddano also had the responsibility to know who every Chicago burglar was, so that the Chicago Outfit could take a "street tax ('Tribute')" percentage of everything he stole.

Legitimate enterprises
A legitimate business that Daddano owned and operated in much of Chicago was a garbage collection company named, "West Suburban  Service".

Prison and death
In May 1966, Daddano was arrested and tried for hijacking $1 million in silver bullion, but was later acquitted. He was later arrested for conspiracy to rob a Franklin Park Bank, a heist planned by him six years earlier. Daddano was sentenced to 15 years in prison, in the Marion, Illinois, federal penitentiary, a supermax prison at the time. The prison was downgraded in 2006.

On September 9, 1975, he died of natural causes in prison, three months after Giancana was executed in the basement of his home by someone who has never been positively identified.

Notes

References
Kelly, Robert J. Encyclopedia of Organized Crime in the United States. Westport, Connecticut: Greenwood Press, 2000. 
Sifakis, Carl. The Mafia Encyclopedia. New York: Da Capo Press, 2005. 
Sifakis, Carl. The Encyclopedia of American Crime. New York: Facts on File Inc., 2001. 
Bureau of Narcotics, U.S. Treasury Department, "Mafia: the Government's Secret File on Organized Crime, HarperCollins Publishers 2007

Further reading
A Report on Chicago Crime Chicago: Chicago Crime Commission Reports, 1954-1968.
United States Congress House Government Operations Federal Effort Against Organized Crime: Role of the Private Sector. 1970.

External links
AmericanMafia.com - The Rosemont Two Step By John William Tuohy
Chicago Sun-Times - Stephens: Probe proves no mob ties by Robert Herguth, Chris Fusco, Art Golab and Steve Warmbir

1912 births
1975 deaths
American gangsters of Italian descent
American people who died in prison custody
Chicago Outfit mobsters
Mafia hitmen
Prisoners who died in United States federal government detention